The 2022–23 season is Blackpool F.C.'s 114th season in the English Football League, and the club's second-consecutive season in the EFL Championship, the second tier of English professional football. The season covers the period from 1 July 2022 to 30 June 2023.

In addition to the league, the club also competed in the 2022–23 FA Cup, reaching the fourth round (they entered in the third round). They were knocked out of the 2022–23 EFL Cup in the first round.

It was Michael Appleton's first season as head coach. He was sacked on 18 January, and replaced by Mick McCarthy.

Pre-season
Blackpool announced their first pre-season friendly on 16 May, with a trip to Southport scheduled for 2 July. A week later, a second fixture, against Salford City was added. A home match against UEFA Europa League finalists Rangers was next added to the calendar. A friendly against Leeds United, at York City's LNER Stadium on 7 July, was announced on 28 June. A second home pre-season tie against Everton was also part of the preparations.

On 4 July 2022, Daniel Grimshaw signed a three-year extension to his contract plus an option for a fourth year. The following day, Oliver Casey was loaned out to Forest Green Rovers for the season. Reece James was loaned to Sheffield Wednesday for the duration of the campaign on 7 July. 

16 July saw the club's first signing of the summer, Lewis Fiorini joining on a season-long loan from Manchester City. Three days later, Rhys Williams joined on loan, also for the season, from Liverpool.

On July 21, the Seasiders added one final pre-season fixture against local side AFC Fylde.

The club made its first permanent signing of the summer on 25 July, left back Dominic Thompson joining from Brentford for an undisclosed fee.

Three days later, forward Theo Corbeanu joined on a season-long loan from Wolves.

Results
The club opened their competitive pre-season with a 2–0 win at Southport. The first half was stopped for around ten minutes after young Southport fans baited the visiting fans, and then retreated quickly when a few Blackpool fans made their way into that stand from their own. CJ Hamilton put Blackpool ahead on fifteen minutes with a low strike. Beryly Lubala doubled their advantage eight minutes later with a header.

On 7 July, Blackpool were beaten 4–0 by Leeds United in their friendly, although the Premier League side played a stronger team than Blackpool manager Michael Appleton expected.

Nine days later, they lost 2–1 to Rangers. Bez Lubala got Blackpool's goal, to halve the deficit.

A Jerry Yates goal gave the Seasiders a victory at Salford City on 19 July.

Frank Lampard brought his Everton team to the seaside on on 24 July. The Toffees won 4–2.

Pre-season was rounded off with a 2–0 win at AFC Fylde. Jerry Yates and Beryly Lubala got the goals.

Season proper

July 
On 30 July, Blackpool hosted Reading. A Callum Connolly goal was the difference, giving the Seasiders an opening-day three points.

August 
On 2 August, midfielder Donovan Lescott signed for the club from Salford City for an undisclosed fee. The following day, another midfielder, Charlie Patino, joined on season-long loan from Arsenal.

Blackpool travelled to Stoke City on 6 August, and were defeated 2–0.

Barrow visited the seaside in the EFL Cup three days later. The match went to extra-time after finishing goalless. No scoring ensued, and the visitors won the resulting penalty shootout.

Defender Richard Keogh departed the seaside for Ipswich Town on 10 August, while left-back Alex Lankshear joined from St Albans City on 12 August.

Back in the league, on 13 August, Blackpool lost at home to Swansea City by virtue of an 87th-minute strike.

Blackpool faced Queens Park Rangers at Loftus Road on 16 August, and returned home with all three points after Josh Bowler's goal in first-half injury time.

On 20 August, Blackpool met Burnley in the league for the first time in nine years. The Clarets went two goals up inside twelve minutes, before Theo Corbeanu got his first goal for Blackpool midway through the first half. Burnley restored their two-goal advantage on 33 minutes. Shayne Lavery opened his goalscoring account for the season, with sixteen minutes remaining, to make it 3–2. Jerry Yates levelled matters two minutes later, also with his first goal of the campaign. Sonny Carey was sent off for the visitors with six minutes of normal time remaining. With the point, their seventh from a possible fifteen, Blackpool sat in eleventh place in the Championship.

Another 3–3 draw followed on 27 August against Bristol City at Bloomfield Road. Josh Bowler opened the scoring, while Blackpool's other goals came from Jerry Yates and Theo Corbeanu for the second-successive game. Blackpool sat in thirteenth place. Earlier in the day, attacking midfielder Ian Poveda joined on a season-long loan from Leeds United.

A single-goal defeat to Lancashire rivals Blackburn Rovers ended August's fixtures. Blackpool had played eight league games, winning three, drawing two and losing three.

On 30 August, Scottish winger Owen Moffat joined the club from Celtic for an undisclosed fee.

September 
The second full month of the campaign began with two new signings: forward Zak Emmerson from Brighton & Hove Albion and midfielder Callum Wright from Leicester City, both for undisclosed fees. Winger Josh Bowler, meanwhile, departed the club for Nottingham Forest. Also leaving, on loan, were forward Ewan Bange (to Queen of the South until January) and midfielder Matty Virtue (to Lincoln City until the end of the campaign).

On 4 September, Blackpool secured a 1–0 victory at Huddersfield Town. Theo Corbeanu, with his third goal of the season, gave the visitors the three points, lifting them to eleventh in the table.

After a postponement of the planned 10 September home fixture with Middlesbrough, Blackpool lost 3–0 at Rotherham United four days later.

On 17 September, Blackpool lost 2–1 at Millwall, leaving the club 19th in the table before a two-week international break.

Free-agent midfielder Liam Bridcutt signed for the club on 30 September. He had been a free agent since leaving Lincoln City, where he had played under Michael Appleton.

October 

A third-successive defeat followed on 1 October, 1–0 at home to Norwich City. A Dominic Thompson own-goal was the difference. Blackpool remained 19th, with eleven points from as many games. 

A goalless draw at Sunderland on 4 October was followed by a 3–1 victory over Watford at Bloomfield Road, with Jerry Yates scoring twice. Blackpool remained 19th. 

Blackpool travelled to Bramall Lane to face Sheffield United on 15 October, and left with a point after a 3–3 draw. The visitors' goals came from Jerry Yates (2) and Kenny Dougall. Three players were sent off, including Blackpool's Marvin Ekpiteta and Dominic Thompson. 

Hull City were victorious in their visit to Bloomfield Road on 19 October. Blackpool's goal in the 1–3 scoreline came from Kenny Dougall. 

The following day, Blackpool beat Preston North End 4–2 in the 97th West Lancashire derby. Jerry Yates scored his third brace in four games, while Charlie Patino and CJ Hamilton also found the net. Blackpool climbed three places to eighteenth with the three points.

Seven days later, Blackpool closed out the month with a second-successive victory, 2–1 at Coventry City. Jerry Yates (seven goals in five games) and Gary Madine scored the goals for the visitors, who climbed another three places, to fifteenth, with the victory.

November 
A single-goal defeat at West Bromwich Albion on 1 November dropped Blackpool one place to sixteenth.

A third defeat in five games ensued, 1–0 at home to Luton Town.

Middlesbrough inflicted a third-straight defeat as Blackpool dropped to 21st in the table.

A fourth followed at Wigan Athletic on 12 November, dropping the Seasiders to second from bottom.

December 
Three consecutive draws — at home to Birmingham City and away to Cardiff City and Hull City — began the month.

A home defeat to Sheffield United rounded out the year.

January 
Full-back Andy Lyons completed his move from Shamrock Rovers on New Year's Day. On the same day, the Seasiders achieved a 1–1 draw at home to Sunderland. Callum Connolly was sent off in injury time for a second booking.

Midfielder Callum Wright joined Plymouth Argyle for an undisclosed fee on 4 January, while Morgan Rogers signed on loan from Manchester City until the end of the season.

After an unsuccessful loan to Olympiacos, winger Josh Bowler returned to the seaside on loan from Nottingham Forest until the end of the campaign.

On 11 January, German midfielder Tom Trybull joined the club on a free transfer from SV Sandhausen.

A 2–0 defeat at Watford on 14 January, leaving Blackpool second-bottom, was Michael Appleton's final game in charge. After one win in eleven games, he was sacked, and replaced by Mick McCarthy.

McCarthy's planned first game in charge, at home to Huddersfield Town on 21 January, was postponed due to a frozen pitch. Grant Ward was released to free agency later in the day.

Central defender Charlie Goode signed on loan from Brentford on 23 January.

Blackpool were knocked out of the FA Cup by Southampton at the fourth-round stage on 28 January. Earlier in the day, the club signed defender Curtis Nelson from Cardiff City on a free transfer.

Forward Ewan Bange joined Radcliffe on a free transfer on 31 January.

February 
A 3–0 defeat at Middlesbrough meant Blackpool had lost seven of their last eleven games.

Two draws at home followed, against Huddersfield Town and Rotherham United, the latter result, a goalless draw, leaving Blackpool bottom of the table, after Wigan Athletic picked up three points. 

On 15 February, Blackpool lost 2–1 at Swansea City.

Three days later, Blackpool beat Stoke City by a single goal at Bloomfield Road, Ian Poveda with the strike. It was their first win in the league since 29 October, and lifted them off the bottom of the table, on goal difference, at the expense of Wigan Athletic.

A single-goal defeat followed at Blackburn Rovers on 21 February. Blackpool sat 23rd in the table. 

February was closed out with a tenth defeat in seventeen games. After 34 league fixtures, Blackpool had picked up 31 points from a possible 102. Blackpool remained 23rd, four points adrift of safety, but bottom club Wigan Athletic had a game in hand.

Competitions

Championship

League table

Results summary

Matches 

On 23 June, the league fixtures were announced.

FA Cup 

The Seasiders were drawn at home to Nottingham Forest in the third round and away to Southampton in the fourth round.

EFL Cup 

Blackpool were drawn at home to Barrow in the first round.

Transfers

In

Out

Loans in

Loans out

References 

Blackpool
Blackpool F.C. seasons
English football clubs 2022–23 season